Kwanyama or Cuanhama is a national language of Angola and Namibia. It is a standardized dialect of the Ovambo language, and is mutually intelligible with Oshindonga, the other Ovambo dialect with a standard written form.

The entire Christian Bible has been translated into Kwanyama and was first published in 1974 under the name Ombibeli by the South African Bible Society. Jehovah’s Witnesses released the modern translation of the new testament, the New World Translation of the Christian Greek Scriptures in Kwanyama in 2019, both printed and electronic online version.

Phonology

/t/ and /d/ are dentalized when followed by a front vowel /i/. An /s/ sound can only occur in loanwords.

References

Bibliography

Further reading
Turvey, B. H. C. (1977) Kwanyama-English Dictionary; compiled by B. H. C. Turvey; edited by W. Zimmermann and G. B. Taapopi.  Johannesburg: Witwatersrand University Press  (based on the work compiled by George Tobias & Basil Henry Capes Turvey, 1954)

External links
 Language map of Namibia
 Grammar and vocabulary 
 PanAfrican L10n page on Kwanyama
 Omalinjongameno Ōngeleka. (Services of the Church in Kwanyama Authorised for Use in the Diocese of Damaraland, 1957) digitized by Richard Mammana 2015

Ovambo language
Languages of Namibia
Languages of Angola